Richard Bingham may refer to:

Richard Bingham (soldier) (1528–1599), English soldier and naval commander, Governor of Connacht
Richard Bingham, 2nd Earl of Lucan (1764–1839), British MP for St Albans, Irish representative peer
Richard Bingham (Conservative politician) (1915–1992), British MP for Liverpool Garston, Judge of Appeal for the Isle of Man
Richard John Bingham, 7th Earl of Lucan (born 1934), British peer, disappeared in 1974, following the murder of his children's nanny